The League of Constance may refer to:

 League of Constance (1415), an alliance of German princes against Louis VII, Duke of Bavaria
 League of Constance (1474), an alliance uniting the Swiss, Rhineland towns and the duke of Austria against Charles the Bold, Duke of Burgundy